The 1944 South Australian National Football League season was the final of three war-interrupted seasons.

References

SANFL
South Australian National Football League seasons